The list of episodes for the Nickelodeon sitcom True Jackson, VP. The series revolves around True Jackson (Keke Palmer), a fashion-savvy teenage girl who becomes the vice president of the youth apparel division of Mad Style, a fashion company based in New York City. 

The series premiered on November 8, 2008 and ended on August 20, 2011, with 60 episodes and 3 seasons.

Series overview

Episodes

Season 1 (2008–09)

Season 2 (2009–10)

Season 3 (2010–11)

See also
List of True Jackson, VP characters

References

External links
 

Lists of American sitcom episodes
Lists of American children's television series episodes
Lists of Nickelodeon television series episodes